The Sebastian Grammar and Junior High School (also known as the Sebastian Elementary School) is a historic school in Sebastian, Florida. It is located at 1235 Main Street. On August 17, 2001, it was added to the U.S. National Register of Historic Places. The building is part of the Sebastian City Hall complex and currently houses a museum.

References

External links

 Indian River County listings at National Register of Historic Places
 Florida's Office of Cultural and Historical Programs
 Indian River County listings
 City Hall - City of Sebastian Offices

National Register of Historic Places in Indian River County, Florida
Buildings and structures in Indian River County, Florida